The Fort Street Union Depot was a passenger train station located at the southwest corner of West Fort Street and Third Street in downtown Detroit, Michigan. It served the city from 1893 to 1971, then demolished in 1974. Today, the downtown campus of Wayne County Community College occupies the site.

History
The union station began construction in 1891 and opened to the public January 21, 1893. It consolidated the operations and services of several rail companies serving Detroit with the exception of the New York Central Railroad and Canadian Pacific Railway, which used Michigan Central Station, and the Grand Trunk Western Railroad, which used Brush Street Station. The Baltimore & Ohio Railroad used the Fort Street facility intermittently. B&O never had its own tracks between Toledo and Detroit. When Pere Marquette (then later C&O which had acquired PM) handled B&O trains north of Toledo, those trains went to Fort Street. When handled by Michigan Central (later New York Central) they went to Michigan Central Station. Upon its opening, the station was located in a transportation district which included the original Michigan Railroad Central Depot two blocks south, and the Detroit and Cleveland Navigation Company nearby on the Detroit River. 

The station was extensively renovated in 1946, adding a restaurant, fluorescent lighting, a baggage room, train gates and other updated amenities. Urban renewal in the 1950s saw the construction of Cobo Hall to the south of the station, and the tunneling of the Lodge Freeway beneath the railway tracks. However, due to dwindling ridership, the station closed April 30, 1971, and despite the attempts of preservationists to repurpose the building, was demolished in January 1974.

Architecture
The depot was built in the Romanesque Revival architectural style by architect James Stewart, a follower of Henry Hobson Richardson. "The depot was described by architectural critics as monumental and gutsy, and of being in a solid, aggressive style. W. Hawkins Ferry, in his The Buildings of Detroit, described the station as being of 'robust plastic composition'. Ross and Carlin mention it proudly as 'an ornament to the city' in their Landmarks of Detroit, published before the turn of the century."

Service
Several named passenger trains departed from the station; many were long-distance flagship trains of their respective railroads.
The Pere Marquette had unnamed service to Bay City via Flint and Saginaw.

Remnants
Parts of the structure are housed at the B&O Railroad Museum in Baltimore, Maryland. Several large pieces from the station have been saved in a warehouse in nearby Fort Wayne.

See also
Brush Street Station
Michigan Central Station

Notes

References

External links
Historic Detroit: Article on the terminal, including photo

Railway stations closed in 1971
Former railway stations in Michigan
Richardsonian Romanesque architecture in Michigan
Former Chesapeake and Ohio Railway stations
Demolished buildings and structures in Detroit
Demolished railway stations in the United States
Former Wabash Railroad stations
Railway stations in Detroit
Railway stations in the United States opened in 1893
Detroit
Buildings and structures demolished in 1974